IL-12 or IL 12 may refer to:

 Interleukin 12, a protein encoded in humans
 Ilyushin Il-12, a Soviet twin-engine airliner and military transport aircraft
 Illinois's 12th congressional district
 Illinois Route 12, a highway in Illinois, United States